Eynesbury Senior College is an independent co-educational senior high school on Franklin Street in the city centre of Adelaide, the capital of South Australia. The college comprises a modern, five-storey, multi-function complex and caters for Year 10, 11 and 12 students.

Due to the impact the Coronavirus pandemic has had on the intake of international students, Eynesbury Senior College will be stopping operation at the end of the 2021 academic year.

The college is characterised by its adult learning environment and its different approach to senior secondary education. Noticeably absent are extra-curricular activities, extensive sporting programs, festivals and other activities which are a feature of traditional schools. As a result, teachers are available outside scheduled class times for extensive one-to-one support. Students are encouraged to see their teachers as colleagues and are free to address them by their first name.

Eynesbury is known for its record of consistent academic success. The median Australian Tertiary Admission Rank of its students has been around 87-90 each year with about 95% going on to undertake tertiary studies.

History

Eynesbury House

Eynesbury House is a heritage-listed late-Victorian Italianate former mansion located at 69 Belair Road, in the Adelaide suburb of Kingswood. With the death of Letchford's second wife in 1872, he moved to Glenelg and sold the property to businessman George Wilcox who named it Eynesbury and enhanced it considerably. The house was added to the South Australian Heritage Register on 12 January 1984.

The name of the house was derived from Eynesbury, Cambridgeshire, in England.

At one stage, the house was occupied by Hare Krishnas and the transition from the temple to Eynesbury College was completed in 1989 after the establishment of a laboratory and library.

Eynesbury College
Eynesbury became a registered school on 1 October 1989. The first intake of Year 11 and Year 12 students was in mid-January 1990, with an initial enrolment of 140 students. The school was initially registered as Eynesbury House Senior Secondary College. However it became known as Eynesbury College.

By 1995 the school had outgrown the Kingswood Campus and, in January 1996, a second larger campus was opened in Franklin Street in the heart of the city of Adelaide. Eynesbury remained a two-campus school until the end of 2001, when teaching was consolidated at an expanded and upgraded Franklin Street campus. Redevelopment of the Franklin Street campus took place over several stages. The first stage involved an extensive upgrade of electrical services, fire protection and the construction of laboratories. This was followed with the rebuilding of reception areas, the construction of additional computing classrooms and science laboratories, and the redevelopment of the outdoor terrace on the second floor as a modern, cafe-style recreation area for students. A new Drama centre was opened in July 2005. In Eynesbury's largest single capital development, the building's air conditioning plant was replaced in 2006. The original two lifts of the Franklin Street campus were replaced in early 2009.

Eynesbury celebrated its 20th birthday in 2009 with the opening of a new campus. Located in Coglin Street, Adelaide, the new campus is the location for the majority of Eynesbury's international students. The Eynesbury Institute of Business and Technology (EIBT) moved to the new campus in April 2009 and other programs followed soon after.

Closure
On the 16th of June 2021, Eynesbury Senior College announced it is closing at the end of the 2021 academic year. Eynesbury Senior College chairman Stephen Spencer said the pending closure was due to the international border closure caused by the Covid-19 pandemic.

Before the international border closure, Navitas provided Eynesbury Senior College with up to 40 percent of its cohort through international students.  It also provides us with staff, our Franklin Street campus, and essential shared facilities. He said.

Due to these reasons Navitas can no longer provide Eynesbury Senior College with a campus or the necessary facilities, support and, importantly, the international students that are required to remain operational.
The College Council explored and exhausted every available option, including relocation of the campus and partnerships with other educational institutions. None of these options proved feasible and there was no viable alternative to closure at the end of 2021. Without the financial benefits of international students, remaining open in these circumstances could compromise the quality of the education that the students expect and deserve and affect their ability to attract and retain quality teaching staff.

Curriculum

Senior High School
As a specialist college with students only in Years 10, 11 and 12, emphasis is placed on helping students prepare for tertiary studies. There are two lessons per week in each subject, each lesson being 1 hour and 50 minutes, with an informal break in the middle. Students are not required to be on campus during unscheduled lesson time.

New students can commence studies at the start of the first or second semester of Year 10 or Year 11. Students wishing to enrol for Year 12 must begin at the start of the year. These entry points are undertaken after an extensive interview process, where future plans and directions, along with approaches to independent learning, are discussed. Eynesbury supports the notion of individualised programming, and increasing numbers of students undertake subjects at more than one year level. Subject choices are the final phase of the entry process.

There is an expectation that all students are engaged in full-time study at all times of their enrolment. Part-time study is typically only taken by students in Year 13 who wish to 'top-up' their results from Year 12. Under new legislation in South Australia, from 1 January 2009, all students under 17 years of age are to be engaged in full-time study or full-time work.

Year 10
All students in Year 10 at Eynesbury study a combination of core and choice subjects. Core subjects are compulsory and include English/English as a Second Language, 'Learning about Thinking', Mathematics, Science and Studies of Society and Environment. These subjects are taken over the whole year. Possible choice subjects are: ASX Stock Exchange Challenge, Business Studies (Financial Literacy), Debating, Creative Writing, Drama, French, Health and Nutrition, Introduction to History, History Through Film, Electronic and Digital Publishing, Physical Education and Visual investigations.

Students who earn an A grade in their subjects in Semester 1 may be offered an opportunity to join regular Stage 1 classes in those or related subjects in Semester 2. Some Year 10 subjects may be offered as new SACE Stage 1 credentialed subjects, particularly in Semester 2.  All Year 10 students are involved in the Eynesbury Mentor Program which incorporates the Personal Learning Plan.

Year 11
All students in Year 11 at Eynesbury study a minimum of 110 credits (a whole year program), even if some Stage 1 units have already been completed. Students will be required to select 100 credits in addition to undertaking the Personal Learning Plan (10 credits) if necessary and the start of the Research Project.

The following subjects are offered at Stage 1 level: Accounting, Ancient Studies, Australian and International Politics, Biology, Business and Enterprise, Chemistry, Drama, Economics, English, English as a Second Language (ESL), Environmental Studies, French (Beginners Level), French (Continuers Level), Geography, Information Technology Systems, Japanese (Continuers Level), Legal Studies, Mathematics, Modern History, Physics, Psychology, Visual Arts - Art, Visual Arts - Design.

Subject changes usually only occur once the first semester of study has been completed. Should a student wish to make a subject change, a request must be put in writing to the Director of Studies halfway through Term 2. After the end of Term 2, subject changes will only be possible in unusual circumstances and at the discretion of the Director of Studies.

Year 12
To be eligible for selection to a university program or course a student must have completed 80 credits of Tertiary Admissions Subjects (TAS). It is expected that all students will complete 80 credits of TAS by the end of Year 12.

The following subjects are offered at Stage 2 level: Accounting, Australian and International Politics, Biology, Business and Enterprise, Chemistry, Chinese (Background Speakers Level), Classical Studies, Drama, Economics, English as a Second Language Studies, English Communications, English Studies, French (Continuers), Geography, Information Technology Studies, Japanese (Continuers), Legal Studies, Mathematical Applications, Mathematical Methods, Mathematical Studies, Specialist Mathematics, Modern History, Physics, Psychology.

Foundation Studies Program
In 1992, Eynesbury College delivered the first University Foundation Studies Program (FSP) in the state on behalf of the University of Adelaide. In 1994, Flinders University and the University of South Australia joined the program which became the South Australian Universities’ Foundation Studies Program. Foundation students are given provisional admission into the degree of their choice, subject to performance in the Foundation Studies Program. Admission is confirmed when students complete the Program and achieve the necessary entry score for that degree as set by the relevant target university.

To date, 96% of students who have completed the FSP have gained university places. The South Australian Universities’ Foundation Studies Program is recognised for entry into interstate universities (subject to meeting entry requirements) including the University of Melbourne, the University of New South Wales, Monash University, the University of Queensland and the University of Western Australia.

The Program, consisting of 6 subjects, also enables Australian students to enter directly into First Year bachelor's degree studies at the University of Adelaide without having to complete SACE Stage 2.

FSP students may start in January (Standard Program - 12 months), April (Accelerated Program - 8 months) or October (Accelerated Program - 8 months or Extended Program - 15 months).

Standard and Accelerated Foundation Studies Programs
The Standard Foundation Studies Program commences in January and is completed in December. Students enrolled in Standard FSP study several of their subjects with Australian Year 12 High School students, e.g. physics, chemistry, biology, economics and others.

Three courses are compulsory for all FSP students: 
Language and Communication (4 hours per week - full course), 
International Studies (2 hours - half course), and 
Clear Thinking and Logic (2 hours - half course).

Students undertaking the Standard FSP (or Stage 2 of the Extended FSP) must take at least three electives from any of the five streams of specialisation. The five streams of specialisation are: 
Business (Accounting, Economics), 
Humanities (Australian and International Politics, Environmental Studies, Modern History), 
Health Sciences (Biology, Chemistry, Mathematics), 
Engineering (Additional Mathematics, Mathematics, Physics) and 
Science (Additional Mathematics, Biology, Chemistry, Mathematics, Physics, Psychology). 
Students taking the Accelerated FSP (starting in April) must choose at least three electives from the Science, Business, Health Sciences and Engineering streams and Environmental Studies. 
Students taking the Accelerated FSP (starting in September) must take at least three elective courses from the Engineering and Business streams only. 
Students attend four hours per week for each elective course.

An Accelerated FSP commences in April and ends in December. The Standard and Accelerated programs both lead to the February intake of university. In addition, an Accelerated FSP commencing in September prepares students for mid-year (July) entry to university. The Accelerated FSP is ideally suited to students with above average academic and language skills. The Accelerated courses mostly cover the same content as the Standard FSP, but some applications of theory may be omitted.

Student assessments for Standard and Accelerated FSP are based on work completed throughout the year and on a final examination held at the end of the course. Each full course is marked out of 100 and the marks of the two half courses (50 each) are added together and counted as one full course. An aggregate score out of 500 is calculated. For students taking three electives this is a simple addition of all marks. Students must achieve a score of 60% or more in Language and Communication, and 275 overall to be considered for admission, subject to specific degree entry scores and quotas. This provides a base score for consideration for entry to Australian universities.

Extended Foundation Studies Program
The Extended FSP is suitable for students who require some additional language development and/or revision in key academic areas. The Extended Program is 4 terms (15 months) in duration. Students take some of the first term (13 weeks) in separate classes specifically designed for Extended Foundation students with a focus on key competencies, skills and content essential for success at Foundation level. During this term, students take three 10-week Core courses (compulsory) and the equivalent of two 10-week Elective courses.

The following courses are compulsory: Language and Study Skills, An Introduction to Communication and Critical Thinking, Mathematics. Students select the equivalent of two full courses from the following introductory areas: An Introduction to Biological Sciences (Biology, Chemistry), An Introduction to the Pure Sciences (Physics, Chemistry, Additional Mathematics) and An Introduction to International Business (Accounting, Economics).

In January, successful Extended Program students join students from the Standard Foundation Studies Program and are integrated into classes with Australian and International Year 12 students for several Elective courses.

Assessment is conducted in two stages. The first stage is the assessment of Term 1 courses (as listed above). The assessment of Term 2 – 5 courses as per the Standard Foundation Studies Program is the second stage of evaluation. Assessment at both stages is based on 50% continuous assessment and 50% for final examinations. Results in the first stage are used to assess successful transition to the second stage. They are not used for the final assessment in the second stage or transition to university.

Scholarships
Eynesbury offers the equivalent of 6-8 full-time enrolments as scholarships (typically broken down into 2 x 100%, 4 x 50% and 8 x 25%). These scholarships are generally intended for students entering Year 10 or 11 and remain in force for an entire academic career at Eynesbury. Offers are based on an aptitude test, a 200-300 word personal statement, past academic and community achievement in addition to an interview with the principal. The scholarship selection process takes place twice per year in Term 1 and Term 3. Official dates are published in the local press, the Eynesbury website and its newsletter, Eynesbury Times.

See also

 List of schools in South Australia

References

External links
 
 Eynesbury Institute of Business and Technology website
 Eynesbury International website

Private secondary schools in Adelaide
Educational institutions established in 1989
1989 establishments in Australia
South Australian Heritage Register
Italianate architecture in Australia
Houses completed in 1881